The Pibor River (also called the River Pibor) is a river in eastern South Sudan, which defines part of South Sudan's border with Ethiopia.

The Pibor and its tributaries drain a watershed  in size. The river's mean annual discharge at its mouth is 98 m³/s (3,460 ft³/s).

Course
The Pibor River is formed by various streams that come together at Pibor Post, a colonial era outpost built in 1912 and originally called Fort Bruce. The Pibor flows north, receiving the Akobo River near Akobo. Continuing north the Pibor receives the Gilo River and Bela Rivers on the right, then joins the Baro River, forming the Sobat River.

Natural history
The Pibor, Baro, Gilo, and Akobo rivers all drain the Ethiopian Highlands. The Baro River is by far the largest, contributing 83% of the total water flowing into the Sobat River. During the rainy season, between June and October, the Baro River alone contributes about 10% of the Nile's water at Aswan, Egypt. In contrast, these rivers have very low flow during the dry season.

History
The boundary between Sudan and Ethiopia was defined for the region near the Pibor River in 1899 by Major H.H. Austin and Major Charles W. Gwynn of the British Royal Engineers. They had no knowledge of the land, its inhabitants, or their languages, and were short on supplies. Rather than defining a line based on ethnic groups and traditional territories, essentially along the escarpment that separates the Ethiopian Highlands and the plains of the Sudanian Savanna, they simply proposed a line drawn down the middle of the Akobo River and parts of the Pibor and Baro rivers. This boundary was consummated in the Anglo-Ethiopian Treaty of 1902, resulting in an area in Ethiopian Gambela Region called the Baro Salient. This area is more closely connected to South Sudan than Ethiopia, both in terms of natural features and people. The Baro Salient was used as a sanctuary by Sudanese insurgents during the country's long civil wars. It was difficult for Sudan to exert authority over a region that is part of Ethiopia, and Ethiopia was reluctant to police this remote region and become involved in the politics of Sudan's internal conflicts.

See also
List of rivers of South Sudan
List of rivers of Ethiopia

References

Further reading 
 C.R.K.B., "Correspondence: the Pibor River", Sudan Notes and Records, 4 (1922), pp. 237 – 240.

Gambela Region
Rivers of South Sudan
Rivers of Ethiopia
Sobat River
International rivers of Africa
Jonglei State
Upper Nile (state)
Ethiopia–South Sudan border
Greater Upper Nile
Border rivers